KulFaZ  [; {{langnf|de||Die kultigsten Filme aller Zeiten,The most iconic film of all time}}) is a spin-off of SchleFaZ. In this format, iconic films are presented by Oliver Kalkofe and Peter Rütten.
However, unlike SchleFaZ, the movies are shown at prime time at Friday evening.

Airing data

Season 1

Valuation 

Oliver Kalkofe and Peter Rütten rate the film in the final moderation.

A voting can also be given by the audience on the homepage https://tele5.de/mediathek/kulfaz after airing the movie.

The categories are, with max. 10 Points per category
 Keeping quality
 Cultness
 Fun factor

Flash Gordon

La boum

Top Secret!

Blues Brothers

References

German satirical television shows